Melissa Etheridge is the debut album by American singer-songwriter Melissa Etheridge, released in 1988.

The album was re-released on September 23, 2003, as a two-CD remastered edition containing a bonus disc of ten tracks recorded live at the Roxy in Los Angeles and a five-track session from BBC Kent in April 1988.

As of 2010, the album has tallied 1,145,000 copies in the United States alone, according to Nielsen SoundScan. This figure does not include sales of the album between 1988 and 1991.

Track listing
All tracks written by Melissa Etheridge.

"Similar Features" – 4:42
"Chrome Plated Heart" – 3:59
"Like the Way I Do" – 5:23
"Precious Pain" – 4:15
"Don't You Need" – 4:59
"The Late September Dogs" – 6:33
"Occasionally" – 2:36
"Watching You" – 5:33
"Bring Me Some Water" – 3:52
"I Want You" – 4:07

Note
The album lists the running time of "I Want You" as 4:07, but the actual running time is 3:43.

Remastered edition bonus disc
"Chrome Plated Heart" – 3:55
"Don't You Need" – 4:54
"Similar Features" – 4:25
"Precious Pain" – 5:55
"Occasionally" – 3:11
"The Late September Dogs" – 6:34
"Watching You" – 5:57
"I Want You" – 5:26
"Bring Me Some Water" – 5:34
"Like The Way I Do" – 10:31
"Chrome Plated Heart" – 3:28
"Don't You Need" – 4:22
"Similar Features" – 4:07
"Bring Me Some Water" – 3:37
"Precious Pain" – 3:52

Personnel
Melissa Etheridge – 12-string Ovation acoustic guitar, vocals, production, arranger
Johnny Lee Schell – guitar - additional overdubs
Waddy Wachtel – guitar - additional overdubs
Kevin McCormick – bass guitar, production
Scott Thurston – keyboards - additional overdubs
Wally Badarou – keyboards - additional overdubs
Craig Krampf – drums, percussion, production, arranger

Overdubs recorded at Studio A, Sunset Sound Factory on November 16-18, 1987. Guitars on "Precious Pain" and "I Want You" recorded at Yo Dad Studio on October 25, 1987.

Technical
Niko Bolas – production
Chris Blackwell – executive producer
Rob Fraboni – executive producer
Engineers: Allan Blazek – engineer
Jim Nipar – engineer
 David Kane – assistant engineer
Duane Seykora – mixing assistant
Bob Vogt – mixing assistant
Stephen Marcussen – mastering
 George DuBose – photography
Tony Wright – cover design

Charts

Weekly charts

Year-end charts

Singles – Billboard (North America)

Certifications and sales

References

Melissa Etheridge albums
1988 debut albums
Albums produced by Niko Bolas
Island Records albums
Albums produced by Craig Krampf